J. Albert "Tripp" Smith (born 1965 or 1966) is an American investment executive, a co-founder of GSO Capital Partners, the credit investment platform of The Blackstone Group.

Early life and education
Smith attended Brebeuf Jesuit Preparatory School in Indianapolis and graduated in 1987 from the University of Notre Dame.

Career
With two colleagues from Donaldson, Lufkin & Jenrette and subsequently Credit Suisse First Boston, Bennett Goodman and Doug Ostrover, Smith founded GSO Capital Partners in 2005; its name derives from their initials. He continued at GSO after its acquisition by Blackstone in 2008, serving as managing director and leaving in 2018. In 2019, he started Iron Park Capital Partners.

He is a non-executive director of British soccer club West Ham United F.C. since purchasing a 10% stake in 2017.  In 2020, there were rumors that he was forming a consortium to purchase a controlling interest in the club.

Personal life
Tripp and his wife, Sheila, have four children.

References

Living people
1960s births
American investment bankers
University of Notre Dame alumni